Alfredo Sánchez Bella (2 October 1916 – 24 April 1999) was a Spanish politician. In 1948 he founded a magazine entitled Mundo Hispánico which became one of the state media outlets. He served as Minister of Information and Tourism of Spain between 1969 and 1973, during the Francoist dictatorship.

References

1916 births
1998 deaths
Information and tourism ministers of Spain
Government ministers during the Francoist dictatorship
Spanish magazine founders